The Harvard Radcliffe Dramatic Club (HRDC), founded in 1908, is an umbrella theater student organization at Harvard College with the purpose of assisting all theatrical projects at the college.  It is mainly concerned with productions at the Loeb Experimental Theater, a small stage at the Loeb Drama Center, the home of the American Repertory Theater.  The Loeb consists of the Mainstage, (used by HRDC for four shows a year, two a semester), and the Experimental Theater, a black box, (around 7 shows per semester).  The club is also involved with productions at the Agassiz Theater, New College Theater and Adams Pool, along with those in various other spaces across campus.

Notable alumni 
 Richard Aldrich, theatre producer and director
 Caroline Giuliani, American filmmaker

References

External links

1908 establishments in Massachusetts